"Rock This Party (Everybody Dance Now)" is a song by French music producer and DJ Bob Sinclar, co-produced by regular partner Cutee B and featuring Dollarman, Big Ali, and Makedah on vocals. The song uses recreated parts of the 1990 hit "Gonna Make You Sweat (Everybody Dance Now)" by C+C Music Factory and was released as the third major single off the album Western Dream, on 21 August 2006. It became Sinclar's most popular single on the UK Singles Chart, peaking at number three. The song also reached number one in Belgium (Flanders and Wallonia) and number six on the Australian ARIA Singles Chart.

Music video
The music video features David Beaudoin, the same boy from the "Love Generation" and "World, Hold On" videos, as well as two young girls. Throughout the video, these actors parody many famous popular songs, artist, and otherwise notable pop culture references. In order, the references are as follows: Tom Cruise during the dance scene in Risky Business, Nirvana's Smells Like Teen Spirit music video, AC/DC, Eminem, Bob Marley. Red Hot Chili Peppers, Sean Paul, The Beatles' performance on The Ed Sullivan Show, Justin Timberlake's Cry Me a River music video, John Travolta in Saturday Night Fever and Michael Jackson's Thriller music video. Bob Sinclar appears in the middle of the music video as a neighbor next door who comes to the house's door step to complain about the loud music being played by the boy in the house.

Track listings and format
12-inch maxi-single (Yellow Productions)
 "Rock This Party (Everybody Dance Now)" [Club Mix] 5:02
 "Rock This Party (Everybody Dance Now)" [Dub Mix] 4:28

5-inch maxi-single (541)
 "Rock This Party (Everybody Dance Now)" [Radio Edit] 3:16
 "Rock This Party (Everybody Dance Now)" [Club Mix] 5:02
 "Rock This Party (Everybody Dance Now)" [Dub Mix] 4:28

'''8-track CD single (Tommy Boy Entertainment, LLC)
 "Rock This Party (Everybody Dance Now)" [Radio Edit] 3:16
 "Rock This Party (Everybody Dance Now)" [Original Club Mix] 5:02
 "Rock This Party (Everybody Dance Now)" [Bobby Blanco & Miki Moto Club Mix] 8:06
 "Rock This Party (Everybody Dance Now)" [London 909 Vocal Mix] 7:52
 "Rock This Party (Everybody Dance Now)" [Mike Cruz Rock This Club Vocal Mix] 8:20
 "Rock This Party (Everybody Dance Now)" [Bobby Blanco & Miki Moto Dub] 6:26
 "Rock This Party (Everybody Dance Now)" [London 909 Dub] 7:40
 "Rock This Party (Everybody Dance Now)" [Mike Cruz Everybody Dance Dub] 7:59

Charts

Weekly charts

Year-end charts

Certifications

Release history

References

Bob Sinclar songs
2006 singles
2006 songs
Songs written by Bob Sinclar
Tommy Boy Records singles
Ultratop 50 Singles (Flanders) number-one singles
Ultratop 50 Singles (Wallonia) number-one singles
Yellow Productions singles